The Pierre-sur-Haute military radio station is a  site used for French military communications. It has been used in the service of France since 1913. It is in the Sauvain and Job communes, with the boundary between the Rhône-Alpes and Auvergne regions passing through the site. There are three towers at the site.

In April 2013, the French interior intelligence agency DCRI pressured the president of Wikimedia France into deleting the French-language Wikipedia article about the station. It was promptly restored by another Wikipedia contributor living in Switzerland. As a result of the controversy, the article temporarily became the most read page on the French Wikipedia, which was noted as an example of the Streisand effect.

History

In 1913, a semaphore telegraph station was built where the military radio station is now. At the time, it was a small stone building, with the semaphore on top.

In 1961, during the Cold War, NATO asked the French Army to build the station as part of the 82-node transmission network in Europe known as the ACE High system. In this network, the Pierre-sur-Haute station, or FLYZ, was a relay between the Lachens (FNIZ) station to the south and the Mont-Août (FADZ) station to the north. The NATO radio station was using American-made tropospheric scatter equipment to relay voice and telegraph signals on a network stretching from Turkey to the Arctic Polar Circle in Norway. The French Air Force took control of the station in 1974. In the late 1980s, the system was gradually replaced by a combination of national defense systems and some NATO-owned subsystems. The large parabolic antennas, known locally as Mickey's ears, were replaced with the current two-antenna setup in 1991.

Role
It is one of the four radio stations along France's north-south axis, in constant communication with the three others: Lacaune, Henrichemont and the Rochefort air base. The station is mainly used for transmissions relating to the command of operational units. If French nuclear weapons were used, the fire order might pass through this relay.

Infrastructure

The perimeter is surrounded by a high barrier of wood and metal.

Buildings

There are three towers at the site. The telecommunication tower is topped by a radome and contains a mode S air traffic control radar beacon system owned by the Directorate General for Civil Aviation. The radar has been in operation since 18 August 2009 but has experienced malfunctions due to heavy snowfall in the area. The two remaining concrete towers are owned by the military. These are built to withstand the blast of a nuclear explosion.

Some buildings are used as garages and living quarters, complete with kitchen, dining room and bedrooms. They are linked together by tunnels,  in total length, so as to avoid walking through thick snow in winter when moving from one building to the other. About 20 personnel are stationed on-site, including electricians, mechanics, and cooks.

Underground facilities
The most important part of the site is the underground section, used for transmissions dispatch: at a speed of 2 Mb/s, communications from the towers are analysed, then redirected to be transmitted. This part of the facility is supplied with chemical, biological, radiological, and nuclear defences. It defends against electromagnetic pulses using a Faraday cage. Positively pressured rooms help prevent contaminants from entering the facility. The facility has independent water and power supplies.

Controversy over Wikipedia article

In March 2013, the French interior intelligence agency DCRI made a request for deletion of the French-language Wikipedia article for the site, .

The DCRI then forced Rémi Mathis, a volunteer administrator of the French-language Wikipedia, and president of Wikimedia France, under threat of detention and arrest, into deleting the article. The article was promptly restored by another Wikipedia contributor living in Switzerland. As a result of the controversy, the article temporarily became the most read page on the French Wikipedia, with more than 120,000 page views during the weekend of 6/7 April 2013. It was noted as an example of the Streisand effect in action. For his role in the controversy, Mathis was named Wikipedian of the Year by Jimmy Wales at Wikimania 2013.

References

External links

Nuclear command and control
Nuclear weapons program of France
Buildings and structures completed in 1913
1913 establishments in France
French Army installations
Installations of the French Air and Space Force
Military communications
Telecommunications in France
Internet censorship in France